Riaz-ur-Rehman Bhatti (1940, in India – 10 July 1966) was a cricketer. An opening batsman and wicketkeeper, he was born in India in 1940 and migrated to Pakistan where he represented Lahore, Karachi and Rawalpindi from January 1959 to December 1961.

He made his eighth and final first-class appearance for Leicestershire County Cricket Club, his county debut against Oxford University in 1966, scoring 18 and 4, a month before his death in a road accident in Loughborough, England.

External links
Cricinfo: Riaz-ur-Rehman

1940 births
1966 deaths
Pakistani cricketers
Lahore cricketers
Rawalpindi cricketers
Leicestershire cricketers
Karachi Greens cricketers
Indian emigrants to Pakistan
Wicket-keepers